Kōshū or Koshu may refer to:

 Kōshū, another name for Kai Province.
 Kōshū, Yamanashi, the present city in Yamanashi Prefecture.
 Koshu (grape), a variety of Grape. / 甲州 (葡萄)

 Kōshū, another name for Hyūga Province.

Koshu, South Korea

 Kōshū (survey ship), a ship of the Imperial Japanese Navy